Juaquapin Creek is a stream in San Diego County, California, in the United States.

Juaquapin is likely derived from a Native American word meaning "warm water".

See also
List of rivers of California

References

Rivers of San Diego County, California
Rivers of Northern California